Hyperaulax is a genus of tropical air-breathing land snails, terrestrial pulmonate gastropod mollusks in the family Odontostomidae.

Species
Species within the genus Hyperaulax include:
 Hyperaulax ramagei (E. A. Smith, 1890)
 Hyperaulax ridleyi (E. A. Smith, 1890) - type species
 Species brought into synonymy
 † Hyperaulax americanus (Heilprin, 1886): synonym of † Tocobaga americanus (Heilprin, 1886) 
 † Hyperaulax ballistae (Dall, 1915): synonym of † Tocobaga floridanus (Conrad, 1846) 
 † Hyperaulax floridanus (Conrad, 1846): synonym of †Tocobaga floridanus (Conrad, 1846) 
 † Hyperaulax heilprinianus (Dall, 1890): synonym of † Tocobaga floridanus (Conrad, 1846) 
 † Hyperaulax limnaeiformis (Meek & Hayden, 1856): synonym of †Lioplacodes limneaformis (Meek & Hayden, 1856) (incorrect subsequent spelling; new combination)
 † Hyperaulax remolinus (Dall, 1915): synonym of † Tocobaga floridanus (Conrad, 1846)  (junior synonym)
 † Hyperaulax stearnsii (Dall, 1890): synonym of † Tocobaga floridanus (Conrad, 1846) (junior synonym)
 † Hyperaulax tampae (Dall, 1915): synonym of †Tocobaga floridanus (Conrad, 1846) (junior synonym)
 † Hyperaulax tortilla (Dall, 1890): synonym of † Tocobaga floridanus (Conrad, 1846) (junior synonym)

References

External links
  Pilsbry H. A. (1897-1898) Manual of Conchology, structural and systematic, with illustrations of the species. Second series: Pulmonata. Volume 11. American Bulimulidae: Bulimulus, Neopetraeus, Oxychona, and South American Drymaeus. Continued by H. A. Pilsbry. page 82-83
 Jousseaume, [F.. (1900). Mollusques terrestres. Clausilia, Rhodea et Bulimus Sud-Americanae. Bulletin de la Société Philomatique de Paris, ser. 9. 2(1): 5-44]
 Salvador, R. B.; Cavallari, D. C. (2019). Taxonomic revision of the genus Hyperaulax Pilsbry, 1897 (Gastropoda, Stylommatophora, Odontostomidae). Zoosystematics and Evolution. 95(2): 453-463.

Odontostomidae
Taxa named by Henry Augustus Pilsbry
Gastropod genera